"Turbo Lover" is a single by heavy metal band Judas Priest from their album Turbo. Unlike the album, most of the reception for this song has been positive, and it is considered a Judas Priest classic.

Lyrics
The song's lyrics have been described as being about "auto"-eroticism.

Singer Rob Halford said, "I just liked the analogy of the motorcycle as a euphemism for love. And 'I'm your turbo lover, Tell me there's no other.' It's got kind of a sexual undertone to it – which is fine. It's been done many times in rock n' roll: to use a machine, car, or motorcycle. It's just a fun bit of escapism more than anything else."

Reception
AllMusic writer, Steve Huey, in his review of the song's parent album Turbo, called it "easily the best song on the record". Decibel Magazine described the song as "one of the classiest songs in [Judas Priest's discography]". Loudwire ranked the song at number 10 on their list of the "10 Best Judas Priest Songs".

Charts

References

1985 songs
1986 singles
Judas Priest songs
Songs written by K. K. Downing
Songs written by Rob Halford
Songs written by Glenn Tipton
Music videos directed by Wayne Isham